

This list of motor yachts by length, is a table of the world's longest active superyachts, with an overall length of at least  and up.

These boats are also known as "megayachts", "gigayachts" and even "terayachts", usually depending on length. It has been generally accepted by naval architects and industry executives that superyachts range from 37 m (≈120 ft) to 60 m (≈200 ft), while those over 60 m are known as megayachts and boats over 90 m (≈300 ft) have been referred to as giga-yachts.

The only legal distinction between boats above 24 m (78.75 ft) and below is that those above 24 m are viewed as a yacht and therefore must have a licensed skipper on board.

Table
}

Notes
Yacht seizures
Following the 2022 Russian invasion of Ukraine, many countries announced sanctions against Russia and Russian President Vladimir Putin, along with a group men known as Russian oligarchs, that are close friends as well as business and political allies of Putin. The sanctions have led to the seizure of their bank accounts and properties through civil forfeiture, (outside of Russia and non-participating countries), including yachts, private jets, expensive artworks, luxury homes, etc., alleging these assets to be the proceeds of crime. All these assets are to be auctioned off, for the benefit of the people of Ukraine.

Misc. notes

See also

 List of yacht support vessels by length
 List of large sailing yachts
 Luxury yacht tender

References

External links
"List and photos of the world's largest yachts" - TheYachtPhoto.com

Lists by length
Lists of ships
Motor yacht
Motor yachts